Mary Kate Schellhardt (born November 1, 1978) is an American actress. She is known for her roles as Ellen in What's Eating Gilbert Grape (1993), and as Barbara Lovell in Ron Howard's Apollo 13 (1995).

Filmography

Film

Television

References

External links

1978 births
Living people
20th-century American actresses
21st-century American actresses
American child actresses
American film actresses
American television actresses
People from Chicago
Actresses from Chicago